Joseph K. Bevilacqua (born January 2, 1959) is an American actor, producer, director, author, dramatist, humorist, cartoonist, and documentarian.

Biography

Early life 
Bevilacqua was born on January 2, 1959, in Newark, New Jersey, the son of a policeman, Joseph Bevilacqua Sr., and a housewife, the former Joan Kvidahl. Bevilacqua began performing as a child. His family moved to Iselin, New Jersey in 1965. In 1971, he began recording his first audio stories, Willoughby and the Professor, half hour stories, in which he performed all of the voices himself, creating live sound effects, and scoring with 78 RPM records he found in his attic.

According to NPR, Bevilacqua sent a 120-minute cassette of his Willoughby stories to voice actor Daws Butler, the voice of Yogi Bear, Quickdraw McGraw, Huckleberry Hound and other Hanna-Barbera and Jay Ward cartoon characters. Butler soon dubbed himself Bevilacqua's mentor.

Author 
Joe Bevilacqua has written and edited a number of books, including Daws Butler, Characters Actor, the authorized biography of his mentor and the voice of Yogi Bear. He co-authored the script book Uncle Dunkle and Donnie with Daws Butler and edited Butler's Scenes for Actors and Voices workbook. He has also written many liner notes on the history of radio for Radio Spirits releases.

Radio career 
Bevilacqua also worked for WBGO, Jazz 88 in Newark, NJ, and produced documentaries for WNYC, New York Public Radio, on jazz legends including Louis Armstrong, Wynton Marsalis, Count Basie, Woody Herman, Cab Calloway, and Lionel Hampton. His features play on NPR.

He is a frequent contributor to National Public Radio, and in 2009, Bevilacqua presented his commentary for Marketplace. about his "green lifestyle".

As of June 2014, Bevilacqua had 14 regularly airing radio series, and 34 hours of new radio per month.

The Joe Bev Hour 
The Joe Bev Hour is the umbrella named used by radio stations for all of his productions  syndicated worldwide:
 The Comedy-O-Rama Hour  is improvised radio theater, performed by regulars Bevilacqua, Lorie Kellogg, Kenny Savoy, Jim Folly and guest stars Rick Overton, Judy Tenuta, Bob Camp (co-creator of Ren and Stimpy), Shelley Berman, Al Franken (before he was a Senator), Bob Edwards, Julie Newmar and Stuart Pankin. The series had a four-year run on Sirius XM Radio before moving to syndication.
 The Jazz-O-Rama Hour  is a music show hosted by Bevilacqua, featuring 78 RPM and early LP recordings remastered from his own personal collection spanning the 1920s to the 1960s.
 The Joe Bev Experience  is an omnibus of documentaries, interviews, comedy and drama.
 Cartoon Carnival  is an hour of rare and classic cartoon audio, children's records, cartoon music and sound effects, new radio cartoons, interviews and mini-documentaries about the animation.
 The Joe Bev Audio Theater  is an anthology of drama and humor storytelling with full casts, sound effects and music.
 The Joe Bev Hour Sunday Edition  is a rotating lineup which includes The Comedy-O-Rama, The Joe Bev Experience, Cartoon Carnival, and The Joe Bev Audio Theater.

Stations running The Joe Bev Hour including WGTD, Wisconsin Public Radio, Sound Stages Radio, WHRO-Norfolk, VA, The 1920s Radio Network, Toon Radio, Pawling Public Radio, Radio New Zealand, WGTD, Wisconsin Public Radio, Sound Stages Radio, WHRO-Norfolk, VA, The 1920s Radio Network, Toon Radio, Pawling Public Radio, Radio New Zealand, Prairie Public, Moab Public Radio, KAZU, WNMU-FM, KREV, WMMT, KAWC, Red River Radio Network, Marfa Public Radio, KCUR, WEZU, WSNC, Troy Public Radio, WCMU Public Radio, WRPI, KUAT, KUHF, KVMR, WRFA, KSVR Studios: Skagit Valley Radio, WHRV, KVMR, WUCF, WFIU, KRPS, KUT, WLRN, WTIP, WNCU, KEOS, KRUA, New Hampshire Public Radio, KGOU, Delta College Public Radio, WPSU, Northeast Indiana Public Radio, KMXT, KUFM - Montana Public Radio, WEFT, Northern Community Radio - KAXE & KBXE, WRVO, WYSO, WMPG, WGUC, KRPS, WEKU, Oregon Public Broadcasting, WXXI, Yellowstone Public Radio, Robin Hood Radio/ WHDD AM 1020/FM 91.9-WLHV FM 88.1 /WGHQ AM 920, WHRV, WVAS, WDCB, WMUK, KCCK, WAMC, Here and Now, WGBH, KWIT, KDUR, WGUC, WJFF, WILL, WNPR, WCAI/WNAN, KTNA, WKSU, WKMS, AMU, KSTX (KPAC), KERA, WFCR, WUAL, KZYX, KCPW, Stan, Delmarva Public Radio, KRCB, WKNO, KSJD, KFSR, KUHF, KQED, Spokane Public Radio, WUIS, WEKU, WEPS, WNCU, WPSU, KUOW, KUHB, KTXK, Raven Radio, WQUB, WCOM, WMUB, KGLT, KDNK, KMXT, KSFR, WVPE, South Dakota Public Broadcasting - Radio, KSUT, KUVO, KDLG, KVNF, KUHB, Yellowstone Public Radio, WERU, KSRQ, WKSU, KRCB, GAUF, WUSM, WDNA, KUGS, WGCU, KFAI, WUTS, East Village Radio, KAOS, KBBI.

Bear Manor Radio 
In March 2014, BearManor Media appointed Joe Bevilacqua as program director of the new Bear Manor Radio Network.

In an announcement dated March 28, 2014, Ben Ohmart, president of Bear Manor Media, the publisher of books about old Hollywood, said, "We are excited to collaborate again with the extraordinarily talented Joe Bevilacqua."

The BearManor Radio went on the air streaming 24/7 on April 1, 2014, with six program. On June 1, 2014, the network added four more hour, all produced by Joe Bevilacqua. These are:
 The Voice Actor Show: Interviews with top voice actors 
 Lorie's Book Nook: Interviews with Bear Manor authors 
 The J-OTR Show: A mix of new and old time radio 
 Fred Frees Favorites: An audio book sampler 
 The Jazz-O-Rama Hour: Early 78 RPM and LP recordings remastered 
 Cartoon Carnival: Interview, music and soundtracks 
 The Lost OTR Show: Recently uncovered old time radio not heard in over 60 years 
 Audio Classics Archive: The top old time radio from the vault of Terry Salomonson 
 What's Cookin' with Chef Steve: Jazz, authors, and recipes

Audio books 
In 2011, Bevilacqua signed a deal with Audible to distribute all of his audiobooks, including radio drama, science fiction, comedy, cartoons, documentary, classic literature, biography, and autobiography.

In 2012, Bevilacqua signed a new deal with Blackstone Audio, which has released nearly 100 audio titles by Bevilacqua, for download, CD, retail and libraries. 100 more are planned for 2014, many radio theater and comedy.

Cartoonist 
Since the 1970s, Joe Bevilacqua has been cartooning his own characters, starting with Willoughby and the Professor. He has drawn for many of his projects and most recently drew cover art for six new Blackstone Audio titles coming up July 1, 2014, under the collective title A Joe Bev Cartoon.

Film and TV 
Joe Bev was also the voice of Unicycler Cat in the North Bay Corp animated television commercials.

Stage 
Bevilacqua's stage work includes roles in Equus, Bedroom Farce, Applause, Black Comedy, and others plays. He tours regularly as Bud Abbott in A Tribute to Bud & Lou with Bob Greenberg as Lou Costello. Bevilacqua has performed at [The Improv], Caroline's on Broadway, Catch a Rising Star, and the Comic Strip. He has opened for Uncle Floyd, and has worked with Al Franken, Shelley Berman, Lewis Black and Rick Overton. Bevilacqua has also MC'd shows featuring Jerry Seinfeld, Bill Mahr and Gilbert Gottfried.

In 1989, funded by The New Jersey Historical Commission and The Monmouth County Historical Society, Bevilacqua produced, directed and starred in A Freneau Sampler, consisting of the poetry, prose and life of Philip Freneau.

Awards 
 2013 – Kean University Distinguished Alumni Award
 2012 – New York TANYS Award for Excellence in Ensemble Acting, for his portrayal of Bud Abbott in The Vaudeville in the Catskills show.
 2006 – New York Festivals award for All Things Considered, a tribute to Joe Barbera
 2004 – Silver Reel Award from the National Federation of Community Broadcasters for his personal essay, "A Guy Named Joe Bevilacqua Audio".
 2001 –  New York Festivals award for Lady Bird Johnson: Legacy of a First Lady

Filmography

Film

Television

References

External links 
 Joe Bevilacqua's Official Waterlogg Productions Blogg
 Waterlogg Productions, Waterlogg Design
Joe Bevilacqua at IMDb

1959 births
Living people
American biographers
American male voice actors
American writers of Italian descent
Male actors from Newark, New Jersey
American male biographers
NPR personalities
Writers from Newark, New Jersey
American radio producers
American radio writers
XM Satellite Radio